Bipartite patella is a condition where the patella, or kneecap, is composed of two separate bones. Instead of fusing together as normally occurs in early childhood, the bones of the patella remain separated. The condition occurs in approximately 12% of the population and is no more likely to occur in males than females. It is often asymptomatic and most commonly diagnosed as an incidental finding, with about 2% of cases becoming symptomatic.

Saupe introduced a classification system for Bipartite Patella back in 1921.
Type 1: Fragment is located at the bottom of the kneecap (5% of cases)
Type 2: Fragment is located on the lateral side of the kneecap (20% of cases)
Type 3: Fragment is located on the upper lateral border of the kneecap (75% of cases)

References

External links 

Congenital disorders of musculoskeletal system
Knee injuries and disorders
Patella